Mix Speaker's, Inc. were a Japanese visual kei rock band formed in early 2006. Their members were Aya (Psycho le Cemu, Isabelle), Seek (Psycho le Cému, Isabelle), Keiji (Kamikaze Boys, Isabelle), S (Kamikaze Boys, Isabelle), Miki (Pink Film, Scissor, Isabelle), and Yuki (Egurigori). Mix Speaker's, Inc. rapidly gained popularity throughout the winter and spring, appearing on the front cover of the visual magazine, Cure Magazine in May. Among their distinguishing marks were the two lead singers, Miki and Yuki, and elaborate monster and fantasy themed costumes.

History
Mix Speaker's, Inc. began preparing to debut on December 1, 2006, from the members of Isabelle and Egurigori (エグリゴリ). They officially started February 19, 2007 and played their first live show at Niigata Club Junk Box on February 23. They played their first one-man, solo show on April 13, 2007, at Shibuya Boxx. Their next set of one-man performances in November 2007 covering three cities were sold out. Their first single, "Mix Speaker's, Box", was released prior to the band's official start, in December 2006.

During July and August 2009, they held a seven-day concert series, each day with one concept conceived by a band member, with the last day dedicated to the fans. The finale, the 8th day, is to be held at Club Citta in Kanagawa, whereas the other performances were in Tokyo proper. All seven shows were sold out, with tickets being sold for the finale after each.

The Final was held at C.C. Lemon Hall on Shibuya, Tokyo, on December 22. in 2009 and was titled "2nd Story Grand Finale [Big Bang Music!]～線路は続くよどこまでも / Senro wa Tsuzukuyo Dokomademo～".

Mix Speakers, Inc. covered Cascade's song "S.O.S. Romantic" for the compilation Crush! -90's V-Rock Best Hit Cover Songs-. The album was released on January 26, 2011 and features current visual kei bands covering songs from bands that were important to the '90s visual kei movement. They covered hide's "50% & 50%" for Tribute II -Visual Spirits-, released on July 3, 2013.

Mix Speakers, Inc. disbanded in February 2018.

Members
Yuki - Vocals, synthesizers, keyboards
 Little Angel
 White Warlock
 Abel Monster
 Wonder Researcher
 Soprano Star
 Prayer Cantor
 Dog Zombie
 Dog Pierrot
 Captain Dolphin
 Zeus Angel
Miki - Vocals, synthesizers, keyboards
 Little Devil
 Black Warlock
 Cain Monster
 Fickle Cat
 Tenor Star
 Weather Forecaster
 Cat Zombie
 Cat Pierrot
 Ghost Pirate
 Hades Lucifer
Aya - Guitars
 Skeleton Witch
 Fire Kyoncie
 Eve Phoenix
 SF Purser
 FF V
 Dry Bandeira
 Rabbit Zombie
 Rabbit Pierrot
 Navigator Clione
 Gabriel Venus
Keiji - Guitars
 Digi Vampire
 Water Ogre
 Adam Dragon
 Mecha Police
 Crescendo Parker
 Hurricane Sala
 Lion Zombie
 Lion Pierrot
 Sniper Seahorse 
 Michael Cupid
Seek - Bass
 Big Franken
 Wood Zombie
 God Turtle
 ET Bomb
 Drill Bass
 Thunder Mucho
 Condor Zombie
 Condor Pierrot
 Carpenter Octopus 
 Uriel Castle
S - Drums, percussion, drum machine
 Moon Wolf
 Wind Mummy
 Pet Tiger
 Robo Cook
 Funny Snare
 Quake Bateria
 Sheep Zombie
 Sheep Pierrot
 Doctor Balloonfish
 Raphael Pegasus

Discography

Albums
 Friday Night "Monstime" (13 June 2007)
 Monsters ~Pocketto no Naka ni ha~ Junk Story (MONSTERS〜ポケットの中にはJUNK STORY〜, 13 February 2008)
 Wonder Traveling (22 October 2008)
 Big Bang Music! (23 September 2009)
 Animal Zombies (7 April 2010)
 Never Ending Story (16 June 2010)
 It's a Dream World (13 July 2011)
 Sea Paradise no Hihou (23 May 2012)
 Hoshifuru Yuenchi regular (6 November 2012)
 Hoshifuru Yuenchi limited (18 December 2012)

Singles
 Mix Speaker's, Box (20 December 2006)
 "Monstart" Family (31 October 2007)
 My Wish [Horror] X'mas (19 December 2007)
 Identification Card (13 August 2008)
 Romeo no Melody (ロメオのメロディ, 1 April 2009)
 Yuuwakusei Rhythm (誘ワク星リズム, 1 July 2009)
 Never Ending Story (16 June 2010)
 Cinderella (シンデレラ, 3 July 2010)
 Midnight Queen (29 September 2010)
 Circus (9 March 2011)
 Shiny Tale (22 February 2012)
 Sky Heaven (4 September 2012)

Omnibus
 Cannon Ball Vol.3 (21 February 2007)
 Crush! -90's V-Rock Best Hit Cover Songs (26 January 2011)
 V-Anime Rocks! (1 August 2012)
 Tribute II -Visual Spirits- (3 July 2013)

DVD
 13's Club (7 December 2007)
 Monster Wars ~Grand Finale~ - (22 July 2008)
 [Departure] ~Space Musical Parade~ - (31 January 2009)
 [Big Bang Music!] ~線路は続くよどこまでも~ - (7 January 2010)
 Rainbow Circus ~6匹のピエロとモノクロサーカス団~ - (22 April 2011)

References

External links
 

Gan-Shin artists
Visual kei musical groups
Japanese electronic rock musical groups
Japanese pop rock music groups